The 1972 New Zealand general election was held on 25 November to elect MPs to the 37th session of the New Zealand Parliament. The Labour Party, led by Norman Kirk, defeated the governing National Party.

Background
The National Party had been in office since the 1960 election, when it had defeated the ruling Labour Party, led by Walter Nash. The Second Labour Government was the shortest-lasting of all New Zealand governments to that day; in contrast, the Second National Government, led for the majority of its tenure by Keith Holyoake, would be re-elected three times. National's policies were focused around stability and a "steady as she goes" approach, but Holyoake's Government was increasingly perceived as tired and worn-out. In February 1972, Holyoake stood aside and was replaced by his deputy, Jack Marshall, who took steps to reinvigorate the party.

Meanwhile, Norman Kirk had been at the helm of Labour since 1965. In this time, he had been modernising and updating the Labour Party, but narrowly lost the 1969 election. Kirk slimmed and dressed to improve his image, and visited several overseas Labour parties to broaden his knowledge. He activated a "spokesman" or shadow cabinet system to spread the responsibility, but it was difficult to avoid one composed largely of Auckland and Christchurch members. Despite the improvements, commentators speculated whether National would pull off another cliffhanger victory. Economic recession and voter fatigue had hurt National at the polls. Labour's slogan was "It's Time – Time for a change, time for Labour", which expertly captured the national mood.

A deciding election issue was the proposed raising of the levels of lakes Manapouri and Te Anau as part of the construction of the Manapouri Power Station to supply the aluminium smelter in Bluff with electricity. National wanted to proceed with the work but Labour pledged to keep the lake levels as they are. It became a deciding issue, with four National incumbents from Otago and Southland losing their electorates (Awarua, Invercargill, Otago Central, and Oamaru).

MPs retiring in 1972
Nine National MPs and one Labour MP intended to retire at the end of the 36th Parliament.

1972 electoral redistribution
This increased to 84 electorates through the 1969 election. The 1972 electoral redistribution saw three additional general seats created for the North Island, bringing the total number of electorates to 87.

Together with increased urbanisation in Christchurch and Nelson, the changes proved very disruptive to existing electorates. Only two South Island electorates were not altered by the redistribution ( and ). Only eight of the North Island electorates were not altered (and ).

In the South Island, three electorates were abolished (and ), and three electorates were newly created (and ). In the North Island, five electorates were abolished (Hauraki, and ), two electorates were recreated ( and ), and six electorates were newly created (and ).

Election day

The date for the 1972 elections was 25 November, a Saturday. 1,583,256 people were registered to vote. There was a turnout of 89.1%, slightly higher than the previous election and considerably higher than the following one. The number of electorates being contested was 87.

Results
The 1972 election saw the Labour Party defeat the governing National Party, winning 55 seats to National's 32. Labour was therefore able to form its first government since 1960, with Norman Kirk becoming Prime Minister. The second National government thus gave way to the third Labour government. No minor parties managed to gain seats, and no independents were elected. There were 1,583,256 electors on the roll, with 1,401,152 (88.50%) voting.

Votes summary

The table below shows the results of the 1972 general election:

Key

|-
 |colspan=8 style="background-color:#FFDEAD" | General electorates
|-

|-
 |colspan=8 style="background-color:#FFDEAD" | Māori electorates
|-

|}
Table footnotes:

Notes

References

 
November 1972 events in New Zealand